Concord High School is a comprehensive public high school located in the rural, distant community of Concord, Arkansas, United States. The high school provides secondary education for students in grades 7 through 12 and serves as one of five public high schools in Cleburne County, Arkansas.

The school's district includes Concord, Drasco, Wilburn, and a very small portion of Tumbling Shoals.

Academics 
Concord High School is accredited by the Arkansas Department of Education (ADE) and the assumed course of study follows the Smart Core curriculum developed by the ADE, which requires students complete at least 22 units prior to graduation. Students complete regular (core and elective) and career focus courses and exams and may take Advanced Placement (AP) courses and exam with the opportunity to receive college credit. Concord receives Title I federal funding.

Athletics 
The Concord High School mascot and athletic emblem is the Pirate with purple and gold serving as the school colors.

The Concord Pirates participate in interscholastic activities within the 1A Classification—the state's smallest classification—from the 1A 2 South Conference, as administered by the Arkansas Activities Association. The Pirates compete in golf (boys/girls), cross country (boys/girls), basketball (boys/girls), baseball, fastpitch softball, tennis (boys/girls) and cheer.

References

External links 
 

Public high schools in Arkansas
Schools in Cleburne County, Arkansas